Bangré is a village in the Thyou Department of Boulkiemdé Province in central western Burkina Faso. It has a population of 218.

References

Populated places in Boulkiemdé Province